Haruna Shaibu (born 25 October 1998) is a Ghanaian footballer who currently plays for Penn FC in the USL.

Career
On 6 April 2018, Shaibu signed with United Soccer League side Penn FC on loan from Inter Allies.

References

External links

1998 births
Living people
Ghanaian footballers
Ghanaian expatriate footballers
International Allies F.C. players
Penn FC players
USL Championship players
Association football defenders
Ghanaian expatriate sportspeople in the United States
Expatriate soccer players in the United States
Footballers from Accra